Kamaishi Seawaves is a Rugby union football club in Kamaishi, Iwate Prefecture, Japan.  It was established in 2001.

At its inception, it was known as Nippon Steel Corporation Kamaishi.

Current squad

The Kamaishi Seawaves squad for the 2023 season is:

Notable players

The following former Kamaishi Seawaves players became Japanese internationals:

Masayoshi Ito
Koji Miyata
Osamu Koyabu
Toru Wada
Kazuo Muraguchi
Takeshi Hatakeyama
Akemi Namura
Ichiro Kobayashi
Kiyoshi Segawa
Jiro Ishiyama
Yuji Matsuo
Shigetaka Mori
Hideo Kobayashi
Koji Horaguchi
Yoshihiko Sakuraba
Michihito Chida

References

External links
 

Rugby clubs established in 2001
Sports teams in Iwate Prefecture
2001 establishments in Japan
Japan Rugby League One teams
Kamaishi, Iwate